Ivan Lilov (Bulgarian: Иван Лилов, August 6, 1988) is a Bulgarian professional basketball player for BC Yambol of the Bulgarian League. He was also a member of the Bulgaria national basketball team.

References

External links
  at basketball.eurobasket.com
  at fiba.com
  at balkanleague.net
  at fibaeurope.com
  at euroleague.net

1988 births
Living people
BC Balkan Botevgrad players
BC Rilski Sportist players
Bulgarian men's basketball players
PBC Academic players
SZTE-Szedeák players
Shooting guards